Rose Cottage is a Grade II-listed building in the community of Ruthin, Denbighshire, Wales, which is a medieval cruck-framed hall-house. It was listed by Cadw (Reference Number 903).

It is a privatively owned residence which is listed as 'an exceptional survival of a medieval cruck-framed hall-house of relatively low status, retaining its plan-form, character and detail.' The chimney is 17th century, and is a fine example of the transition between an open-hearth and a full fireplace.

Location
This building is beside the road entering Ruthin from Mold.

Notes 

Grade II listed buildings in Ruthin